Clovis West High School (CWHS) is a co-educational, public high school part of the Clovis Unified School District in the well-established suburban community in northeast Fresno, California. It was founded in 1976, and has grades 9-12. Clovis West High School is ranked 206th within California. The AP participation rate at Clovis West High School is 41 percent. 833 tests administered and 71% tested received a score of “3” or higher. The student body makeup is 51 percent male and 49 percent female, and the total minority enrollment is 51 percent, primarily Hispanic. Clovis West High School is one of five high schools in the Clovis Unified School District. It is a National Blue Ribbon School and a California Distinguished School.

Academics

State testing
In 2010, Clovis West High School attained an API of 852, placing the school towards the top of the California state high schools. The average SAT score for 2010-2011 is 509 (verbal), 540 (mathematics), and 515 (writing). Current results for the school's scoring are maintained at the California Standardized Testing And Reporting (STAR) Program.

Athletics

Fall schedule
 Varsity Cross country
 Varsity/Junior Varsity/Freshman Football
 Girl's Varsity and Junior Varsity Golf
 Gymnastics
 Girl's Varsity and Junior Varsity Tennis
 Girl's Varsity/Junior Varsity/Freshman Volleyball
 Girl's Varsity and Junior Varsity Water polo
 Boy's Varsity and Junior Varsity Water Polo

Winter schedule
 Boy's Varsity/Junior Varsity/Freshman Basketball
 Girl's Varsity/Junior Varsity/Freshman Basketball
 Boy's Varsity/Junior Varsity/Freshman Soccer
 Girl's Varsity/Junior Varsity/Freshman Soccer
 Wrestling

Spring schedule
 Boy's Varsity/Junior Varsity/Freshman Baseball
 Boy's Varsity and Junior Varsity Golf
 Girl's Varsity/Junior Varsity/Freshman Softball
 Swimming and Diving
 Boy's Varsity and Junior Varsity Tennis
 Track and field
 Boy's Varsity/Junior Varsity/Freshman Volleyball

Clovis West High School competes in the California Interscholastic Federation's (CIF) Central Section. The Clovis Olympic Swim Complex, located at Clovis West High School plays host to the CIF State Swim and Dive Championships.

Performing arts

Instrumental Music
 Wind Symphony
 Concert Band
 Color Guard
 Winter Guard
 Jazz Band
 Marching Band
 Percussion

Choral Music
 Chamber Singers
 Concert Choir
 Women's Chorale
 Women's Ensemble
 Women's Chorus
 Show Choir

Drama
 Improv Team
 Mock Trial

Folklorico
 Flamenco

Student life

Clovis West rivalry
Clovis West High School harbors a strong sense of competitiveness with other schools within its district: Clovis North High School, Clovis East High School, Clovis High School, and Buchanan High School.

Notable alumni
McKay Christensen (1975-), Major League Baseball player, most notably the 2000 Chicago White Sox.
Zubin Damania, physician, comedian, internet personality, musician, and founder of Turntable Health
Kevin Federline (1978-), Dancer, musician, and actor.
Dan Klatt (1978-), American water polo player. Member of the 2004 U.S. Olympic water polo team in Athens.
Nwanneka Okwelogu (Nikki) (1995-), track and field athlete, member of the 2016 Nigerian Olympic Athletics team.
Aaron Ruell (1976-), American actor and director. Most notable for his role as "Kip" in Napoleon Dynamite.
Jeff Tuel (1991-), American football quarterback for the Buffalo Bills.
Billy Volek (1976-), American football quarterback for the San Diego Chargers.
Michael J. Willett (1989-), American musician and actor.
Damien Richardson (1976-), American football safety for the Carolina Panthers
Ruth Lawanson (1963-) Olympic medalist. American Volleyball player. She was on the U.S. national team for four years. She won bronze medals with the team at the 1990 World Championships, 1991 World Cup, and 1992 Summer Olympics.
Amanda Leighton (1993-) voice actress
Kevin Pickford (1975-) Major League Baseball pitcher
Adrian Martinez (2000-) American football quarterback for the Nebraska Cornhuskers

References

External links

High schools in Fresno, California
Public high schools in California
1976 establishments in California
Educational institutions established in 1976